The first election to Antrim and Newtownabbey Borough Council, part of the Northern Ireland local elections on 22 May 2014, returned 40 members to the newly formed council via Single Transferable Vote. The Democratic Unionist Party won a plurality of votes and seats.

Election results

Districts summary

|- class="unsortable" align="centre"
!rowspan=2 align="left"|Ward
! % 
!Cllrs
! %
!Cllrs
! %
!Cllrs
! %
!Cllrs
! %
!Cllrs
! %
!Cllrs
! %
!Cllrs
!rowspan=2|TotalCllrs
|- class="unsortable" align="center"
!colspan=2 bgcolor="" | DUP
!colspan=2 bgcolor="" | UUP
!colspan=2 bgcolor="" | Alliance
!colspan=2 bgcolor=""| SDLP
!colspan=2 bgcolor=""| Sinn Féin
!colspan=2 bgcolor="" | TUV
!colspan=2 bgcolor="white"| Others
|-
|align="left"|Airport
|bgcolor="#D46A4C"|24.8
|bgcolor="#D46A4C"|1
|24.6
|2
|8.8
|0
|17.7
|1
|19.6
|1
|0.0
|0
|4.5
|0
|5
|-
|align="left"|Antrim
|bgcolor="#D46A4C"|30.9
|bgcolor="#D46A4C"|2
|22.9
|2
|13.5
|1
|10.2
|1
|10.6
|0
|9.4
|0
|2.5
|0
|6
|-
|align="left"|Ballyclare
|bgcolor="#D46A4C"|35.8
|bgcolor="#D46A4C"|2
|29.1
|2
|9.9
|0
|0.0
|0
|0.0
|0
|13.4
|1
|11.8
|0
|5
|-
|align="left"|Dunsilly
|bgcolor="#D46A4C"|29.7
|bgcolor="#D46A4C"|2
|18.6
|1
|8.2
|0
|18.8
|0
|24.7
|0
|0.0
|0
|0.0
|0
|5
|-
|align="left"|Glengormley Urban
|bgcolor="#D46A4C"|28.8
|bgcolor="#D46A4C"|2
|21.6
|2
|15.4
|1
|9.9
|1
|20.9
|1
|0.0
|0
|3.4
|0
|7
|-
|align="left"|Macedon
|bgcolor="#D46A4C"|45.2
|bgcolor="#D46A4C"|3
|9.1
|1
|14.0
|1
|3.0
|0
|9.4
|0
|10.9
|1
|8.4
|0
|6
|-
|align="left"|Three Mile Water
|bgcolor="#D46A4C"|32.0
|bgcolor="#D46A4C"|3
|28.2
|2
|17.7
|1
|0.0
|0
|0.0
|0
|7.9
|0
|14.2
|0
|6
|- class="unsortable" class="sortbottom" style="background:#C9C9C9"
|align="left"| Total
|32.2
|15
|22.0
|12
|12.7
|4
|8.6
|4
|12.4
|3
|5.7
|2
|6.4
|0
|40
|-
|}

District results

Airport

2014: 2 x UUP, 1 x DUP, 1 x SDLP, 1 x Sinn Féin

Antrim

2014: 2 x DUP, 2 x UUP, 1 x Alliance, 1 x SDLP

Ballyclare

2014: 2 x DUP, 2 x UUP, 1 x TUV

Dunsilly

2014: 2 x DUP, 1 x Sinn Féin, 1 x UUP, 1 x SDLP

Glengormley Urban

2014: 2 x DUP, 2 x UUP, 1 x Sinn Féin, 1 x Alliance, 1 x SDLP

Macedon

2014: 3 x DUP, 1 x Alliance, 1 x TUV, 1 x UUP

Three Mile Water

2014: 3 x DUP, 2 x UUP, 1 x Alliance

* Incumbent

Changes during the term

† Co-options

‡ Changes in affiliation

Last updated 26 March 2019.

Current composition: see Antrim and Newtownabbey Borough Council

References

2014 Northern Ireland local elections
21st century in County Antrim
Elections in County Antrim